Scrobipalpa saltans is a moth in the family Gelechiidae. It was described by Wakeham-Dawson in 2012. It is found on the Falkland Islands.

Etymology
The species name refers to its jumping habit and is derived from Latin saltans.

References

Scrobipalpa
Moths described in 2012